Alexandra Shepard  is Professor of Gender History at the University of Glasgow. In 2018 Shepard was elected a Fellow of the British Academy in recognition for her work in gender history and the social history of early modern Britain. In 2019 she was elected a Fellow of the Royal Society of Edinburgh.

Career 
Shepard is Professor of Gender History within the School of Humanities at the University of Glasgow, where her research interests focus on early modern British history, with an emphasis on the social, cultural and economic history and gender relations. Her work has particular emphasis on masculinity in England in the 16th and 17th centuries, and more recently has undertaken comparative research on women's work and agency in early modern history. Her work has contributed to changing the understanding of working-class life over the past five centuries.

She is Co-Investigator of the Arts and Humanities Research Council funded project ‘Women Negotiating the Boundaries of Justice: Britain and Ireland, c.1100-c.1750’, which explores women's access to justice across Britain and Ireland between the 12th and 18th centuries. Shepard also leads a Leverhulme International Network Grant on “Producing Change: Gender and Work in Early Modern Europe", awarded in 2015.

She previously worked as a lecturer in history at Christ's College, Cambridge. Her PhD thesis studied Early Modern student life at Cambridge University, and in particular how undergraduate students expressed their male identities.

Awards 
Shepard won the Leo Gershoy Award in 2016 for second book, Accounting for Oneself, published in February 2015; an annual prize awarded by the American Historical Association for outstanding works published on 17th- and 18th-century European history’. The book, a culmination of a decade of work, examines how ordinary people valued themselves and understood social order and self-esteem, using innovative methods of historiography. Shepard used over 13,000 witness statements, of which 3,331 were by women, made between the years 1550 to 1728 in church courts and Cambridge University courts, to examine the relationship between wealth, occupation and social identity.

In 2004, whilst at Christ's College, Cambridge, Dr Shepard was awarded a Philip Leverhulme Prize. In 2017, Shepard received a Leverhulme Research Fellowships for research on family and economy in England, 1660–1815.

Bibliography 

 Shepard, A. (2015) Accounting for Oneself: Worth, Status and the Social Order in Early Modern England. Oxford University Press: Oxford. 
 Shepard, A. (2003) The Meanings of Manhood in Early Modern England, 1560-1640. Series: Oxford studies in social history. Oxford University Press: Oxford.

References 

Alumni of the University of Cambridge
Year of birth missing (living people)
Living people
Women historians
Fellows of the British Academy
Gender studies academics
Academics of the University of Glasgow
Historians of the early modern period